Michaël Llodra (born 18 May 1980) is a French former professional tennis player. He was a successful doubles player with three Grand Slam championships and an Olympic silver medal, and has also had success in singles, winning five career titles and gaining victories over Novak Djokovic, Juan Martín del Potro, Tomáš Berdych, Robin Söderling, Jo-Wilfried Tsonga, Nikolay Davydenko, Janko Tipsarević and John Isner. Llodra has been called "the best volleyer on tour".

Life and career

Llodra was born in Paris, where his father Michel played for Paris Saint-Germain. A left-hander, his serve-and-volley style is modelled on that of his idol, Stefan Edberg.

Llodra and his wife Camille were married on 9 September 2003, and have two children, a daughter, Manon (born March 23, 2004) and a son, Teo (born 5 September 2007). He is a well-known supporter of French football club Paris Saint-Germain, and has often been seen wearing the club's shirt prior to tennis matches.

2002
Llodra reached his first Grand Slam final, the Australian Open men's doubles, with Fabrice Santoro. Unseeded, they lost to Mark Knowles and Daniel Nestor. During his semifinal, Llodra inadvertently hit a bird.

2003
Llodra won his first Grand Slam title, the Australian Open men's doubles, with Santoro. Their opponents in the final were once again Knowles and Nestor.

2004
Upon winning the men's doubles again for the second time at the Australian Open in 2004, Llodra and his tennis partner Santoro made headlines by stripping off their shirts, shoes, socks and shorts. Dressed in a pair of white briefs only, Llodra threw his clothes into the crowd, to the cheers of many onlookers.

Llodra made his first appearance in the fourth round of a Grand Slam singles tournament at that year's French Open. In the fourth round he led eventual semifinalist Tim Henman by two sets to love and had a match point in the fifth set before Henman prevailed. Llodra also won his first ATP singles title two weeks later at 's-Hertogenbosch.

2005
On 20 November 2005, Llodra again teamed with Santoro to win the Tennis Masters Cup in Shanghai, a competition which pitted the top eight doubles teams in the world against one another.

2007
In July, Llodra won the men's doubles title at Wimbledon partnering Arnaud Clément, beating Bob and Mike Bryan, thus winning his third Grand Slam doubles title. He and Clément were ecstatic and Llodra once again celebrated by throwing his shirt, racket and towel into the crowd.

At the US Open, he and Clément were seeded seventh, but were upset in the second round by Jesse Levine and Alex Kuznetsov.

2008
Llodra and Clément reached a second Grand Slam final at the Australian Open, but lost to the Israeli pairing of Jonathan Erlich and Andy Ram.

In singles, Llodra won two tournaments in the course of two months, the first in Adelaide, where he defeated Jarkko Nieminen in the final, and the other in Rotterdam, where he edged out Robin Söderling in a third-set tiebreak.

Llodra and his doubles partner Clément then defeated the Bryan Brothers again in four sets at the Davis Cup quarterfinals tie against the US team. They are one of two teams to defeat the Bryans in Davis Cup.

He then entered the French Open, where he upset Tomáš Berdych in the second round and went on to reach the fourth round, losing to Latvian Ernests Gulbis in straight sets.

2009

In 2009, he made two finals in singles; the Open 13 in Marseille (l. to Tsonga) and the Grand Prix in Lyon (l. to Ljubicic). He had a poor season in doubles.

2010
Llodra started off the season with opening-round losses in Brisbane and Sydney. He made the second round of the Australian Open, losing to Juan Mónaco in five sets.

He lost to Marco Chiudinelli in the opening round in Rotterdam. The following week, he impressively won the Open 13 tournament in Marseille. He beat two well-known players on the rise: seventh seed Marcos Baghdatis (in the second round) and top seed Robin Söderling (in the quarterfinals). In the final, he defeated Julien Benneteau in straight sets in their first meeting on the ATP tour. Llodra and Benneteau also teamed up to win the doubles title in Marseille. Llodra also won at Eastbourne, beating Guillermo García-López in the final.

Llodra lost in the first round at the French Open, the second round at Wimbledon, and made the third round at the US Open before retiring against Tommy Robredo.

At the BNP Paribas Masters tournament in Paris-Bercy, he played his best tennis in an ATP Masters 1000 tournament, where he defeated second seed Novak Djokovic and then eleventh seed Nikolay Davydenko in the quarterfinals. Llodra then held three match points against world No. 5 and eventual champion Robin Söderling, but eventually lost in a third-set tiebreak. Had Llodra won, it would have been an all-French final in Paris with compatriot Gaël Monfils.

2011
At the Australian Open, Llodra and Zimonjic lost in the quarterfinals to Mahesh Bhupathi and Leander Paes. They reached the final in Rotterdam, but lost to Jürgen Melzer and Petzschner. They reached the semifinals in Dubai, but lost to Jérémy Chardy and Feliciano López, again in a super-tiebreak. They reached the quarterfinals in Miami, again losing to Bhupathi and Paes. In Madrid, they lost the final to the Bryan brothers. In Rome, they reached the quarterfinals, losing to Carlos Berlocq and Jarkko Nieminen.

The team made the semifinals at the French Open and at Wimbledon, losing to Max Mirnyi and Daniel Nestor in a match featuring two tiebreaks, and to the Bryan brothers in five sets. They won their first two titles of the year in Washington, D.C., and at the Canadian Open, against Robert Lindstedt and Horia Tecău and the Bryan brothers, respectively. They lost in the final in Cincinnati, again against Bhupathi and Paes.

They did not make it past the round of 16 at the US Open, but they took their third title of the year at the China Open, again against Lindstedt and Tecau. They lost in the final in Shanghai against Max Mirnyi and Nestor in a super-tiebreak. They took their fourth title together in Basel, again defeating Mirnyi and Nestor in the final.

They reached the quarterfinals in Bercy and participated in the 2011 ATP World Tour Finals in London, winning their first round-robin match against Rohan Bopanna and Aisam Qureshi.

In singles, Llodra reached the quarterfinals in Marseille, losing to Robin Söderling. He also reached the quarterfinals in Madrid, losing to finalist Rafael Nadal. He lost in the first round at the French Open and in the round of 16 at Wimbledon. In the US Open, he lost in the second round to Kevin Anderson in straight sets.

2012
At the BNP Paribas Masters in Paris (Bercy), Llodra reached the semifinals, after upsetting tenth and seventh seeds John Isner and Juan Martín del Potro, even though he was the lowest-ranked player in the draw. He also beat American Sam Querrey in the quarterfinals. He faced David Ferrer for a place in the final, but lost.

2013
At the Dubai Open, Llodra stunned world No. 8 and Australian Open 2008 finalist Jo-Wilfried Tsonga in straight sets, but lost to Dmitry Tursunov in the next round. Llodra was also in the men's doubles finals of the French Open with Nicolas Mahut, but lost to the Bryan brothers in the final.

2014
In 2014 Llodra played fewer tournaments and had less success in singles than the previous years. He suffered first-round losses at the Australian Open and French Open, and skipped Wimbledon. He did, however, get a win at the US Open, defeating Daniel Gimeno-Traver.

Playing style
Llodra was known for his skilled net play. The Guardian journalist Xan Brooks described Llodra as "one of those talented, maddening French players in the tradition of Henri Leconte, Guy Forget and Fabrice Santoro; at once supremely gifted and curiously brittle" and that he "plays like he's just flown in from the 20th-century. His game is all dinks and slices and sly changes of pace." Two-time French Open finalist Robin Söderling called Llodra's serve "unbelievable" and his volleys the "best on the tour". To aid his touch on volleys, Llodra was one of the few professionals to use all natural gut strings, which gave him better feel at the expense of power at the baseline.

Llodra was one of the last remaining serve-and-volleyers in the top ranks of men's professional tennis, a tactic aided by his left-handed serve which allowed him to create unusual angles. Llodra has been called the 'best serve and volleyer in the world' by the website Essential Tennis.

Significant finals

Grand Slam tournament finals

Men's doubles: 7 (3 titles, 4 runner-ups)

Olympic finals

Men's doubles: 2 (1 Silver medal, 1 4th place)

Year-end championships

Doubles: 2 (1 title, 1 runner-up)

Masters 1000 finals

Doubles: 11 (3 titles, 8 runner-ups)

ATP career finals

Singles: 10 (5 titles, 5 runner-ups)

Doubles: 48 (26 titles, 22 runner-ups)

Performance timelines

Singles

Doubles

Top 10 wins

Incidents

Bird
In the 2002 Australian Open men's doubles semifinal against Julien Boutter and Arnaud Clément, a small bird (identified as a house martin) flew into the court chasing a moth. It flew into the path of a hard-hit volley by Llodra. After an impromptu funeral ceremony led by Boutter, the match continued, with Llodra and Santoro eventually winning 6–3, 3–6, 12–10. Llodra remarked afterwards, "I didn't do it deliberately. But at least I saved the moth."

Nude in the locker
In the 2005 Key Biscayne tournament, Llodra was hiding nude in Ivan Ljubicic's locker. When Ljubicic discovered him, Llodra stated that he "tried to get his positive energy". In 2005 Ljubicic was playing his most successful season by then.

Accusation of racism
After his first round victory over Ernests Gulbis at the 2012 BNP Paribas Open at Indian Wells, during which Llodra was overheard by fans and journalists making racist and sexist comments to a female Gulbis fan, Llodra was fined $2500 by the ATP for his behaviour. He later admitted making the comments in interviews with French media and complained that the fine was too high. Llodra did not make matters better for himself during an interview with a reporter from the Chinese news Web site SINA.com, in which the Frenchman attempted to apologize for his remarks. "My words were not aimed at China," Llodra began. "I love Chinese — I can totally make love with a Chinese girl," he added, before being cut off by the A.T.P. official monitoring the interview. The journalist, who took offense at the remark, said that he did not find Llodra's apology sincere. This was not the first incident in which charges of racism have been leveled at Llodra. He denied his comments were racist during his 2011 French Open first round defeat at the hands of Belgian qualifier Steve Darcis, comparing the atmosphere on court to that of a north African souk while veteran Moroccan umpire Mohammed El Jennati was in the chair.

References

External links

 
 
 
 bio -file interview with Michael Llodra

1980 births
Australian Open (tennis) champions
Living people
Tennis players from Paris
French male tennis players
Olympic tennis players of France
Tennis players at the 2004 Summer Olympics
Tennis players at the 2008 Summer Olympics
Tennis players at the 2012 Summer Olympics
Wimbledon champions
Olympic medalists in tennis
Olympic silver medalists for France
Grand Slam (tennis) champions in men's doubles
Medalists at the 2012 Summer Olympics
Knights of the Ordre national du Mérite